Ángel Román Bautista Aguilar (born 18 September 1994) is a Mexican footballer who plays as a midfielder for Oaxaca on loan from Pachuca.

References

External links

1994 births
Living people
Footballers from Hidalgo (state)
Association football midfielders
Alebrijes de Oaxaca players
Tlaxcala F.C. players
Mexican footballers